El Escorial is a palace-monastery near Madrid, Spain.

El Escorial may also refer to:
El Escorial, Madrid, a nearby municipality
San Lorenzo de El Escorial, the municipality in which the palace is situated
El Escorial, Chubut, a village in Argentina.